The use, sale, and possession of cannabis over 0.3% THC in the United States, despite laws in many states permitting it under various circumstances, is illegal under federal law. As a Schedule I drug under the federal Controlled Substances Act (CSA) of 1970, cannabis over 0.3% THC (legal term marijuana) is considered to have "no accepted medical use" and have a high potential for abuse and physical or psychological dependence. Cannabis use is illegal for any reason, with the exception of FDA-approved research programs. However, individual states have enacted legislation permitting exemptions for various uses, including medical, industrial, and recreational use.

Cannabis for industrial uses (hemp) was made illegal to grow without a permit under the CSA because of its relation to cannabis as a drug, and any imported products must adhere to a zero tolerance policy. The Agricultural Act of 2014 allows for universities and state-level departments of agriculture to cultivate cannabis for research into its industrial potential. In December 2018, hemp was permitted to be grown in the U.S. under federal law after the Hemp Farming Act was included in the passed 2018 Farm Bill.

As a psychoactive drug, cannabis continues to find extensive favor among recreational and medical users in the U.S. As of 2022, twenty-one states, three U.S. territories, and the District of Columbia have legalized recreational use of cannabis. Thirty-seven states, four U.S. territories, and D.C. have legalized medical use of the drug. Multiple efforts to reschedule cannabis under the CSA have failed, and the U.S. Supreme Court has ruled in United States v. Oakland Cannabis Buyers' Cooperative (2001) and Gonzales v. Raich (2005) that the federal government has a right to regulate and criminalize cannabis, whether medical or recreational. As a result, cannabis dispensaries are licensed by each state; these businesses sell cannabis products that have not been approved by the U.S. Food and Drug Administration, nor are they legally registered with the federal government to sell controlled substances. Although cannabis has not been approved, the FDA recognizes the potential benefits and has approved two drugs that contain components of marijuana. 

The ability of states to implement cannabis legalization policies was weakened after U.S. Attorney General Jeff Sessions rescinded the Cole Memorandum on January 4, 2018, and issued a new memo instructing U.S. attorneys to enforce federal law related to marijuana. The Cole memo, issued by former Deputy Attorney General James Cole in 2013, urged federal prosecutors to refrain from targeting state-legal marijuana operations.  Regarding the medical use of cannabis, the Rohrabacher–Farr amendment still remains in effect to protect state-legal medical cannabis activities from enforcement of federal law.

Historic overview
The Marihuana Tax Act of 1937 was one of the first measures to cannabis nationwide. This act was overturned in 1969 in Leary v. United States, and was repealed and replaced with the Controlled Substances Act (CSA) by Congress the next year. Under the CSA cannabis was assigned a Schedule I classification, deemed to have a high potential for abuse and no accepted medical use – thereby prohibiting even medical use of the drug. The classification has remained since the CSA was first signed into law, despite multiple efforts to reschedule. In direct response, the U.S. Libertarian Party was one of the first major parties to endorse cannabis legalization in their first platform in 1972 which stated, "We favor the repeal of all laws creating "crimes without victims" now incorporated in Federal, state and local laws—such as laws on voluntary sexual relations, drug use, gambling, and attempted suicide." As cannabis prohibition continued into the 21st Century, the U.S. Marijuana Party was formed in 2002 as a single-issue party to end the war on drugs and to legalize cannabis. States have also begun to engage in the process of nullification to override federal laws pertaining to cannabis. California started the trend by legalizing medicinal cannabis in 1996. Now, cannabis has been fully legalized for recreational use in 19 states with most states having some sort of state nullification of federal cannabis laws. In 1969, Gallup conducted a poll asking Americans whether "the use of marijuana should be legal" with only 12% at the time saying yes. In 1977, it rose to 28% and experienced a period of gradual increase thereafter. According to the latest poll, two-thirds of Americans think marijuana use should be legal.

Usage 

Roger Roffman, a professor of social work at the University of Washington, asserted in July 2013 that "approximately 3.6 million Americans are daily or near daily users." Peter Reuter, a professor at the School of Public Policy and the Department of Criminology at the University of Maryland, College Park, said that "experimenting with marijuana has long been a normal part of growing up in the U.S.; about half of the population born since 1960 has tried the drug by age 21." A World Health Organization survey found that the U.S. is the world's leading per capita marijuana consumer. The 2007 National Survey on Drug Use & Health prepared by the U.S. Department of Health and Human Services indicated that 14.4 million U.S. citizens over the age of 12 had used marijuana within a month. The 2008 survey found that 35 million Americans were willing to tell government representatives that they had used marijuana in the past year.

According to the 2001 National Survey on Drug Use and Health by the Substance Abuse and Mental Health Services Administration, a branch of the U.S. Department of Health and Human Services, 41.9% (more than 2 in 5) of all Americans 12 or older have used cannabis at some point in their lives, while 11.5% (about 1 in 9) reported using it "this year." According to a 2022 Gallup survey, 16% of Americans reported being marijuana smokers (up from 7% in 2013) and 48% reported trying marijuana at some point in their lifetimes (up from 4% in 1969).

Medical use is a common reason why people use marijuana. According to the National Institute on Drug Abuse, "The term medical marijuana refers to using the whole unprocessed marijuana plant or its basic extracts to treat a disease or symptom." However, the U.S Food and Drug Administration (FDA) has not officially approved marijuana as a medicine.

Legality

Federal 
Since the Controlled Substances Act of 1970 classified marijuana as a Schedule I drug, until the passage of the 2018 United States farm bill, under federal law it was illegal to possess, use, buy, sell, or cultivate cannabis in all U.S. jurisdictions. As a Schedule I substance, the highest restriction of five different schedules of controlled substances, it is claimed cannabis has a high potential for abuse and has no acceptable medical use. Despite this federal prohibition, some state and local governments established laws attempting to decriminalize cannabis, which has reduced the number of "simple possession" offenders sent to jail, since federal law enforcement rarely targets individuals directly for such relatively minor offenses. Other state and local governments ask law enforcement agencies to limit enforcement of drug laws with respect to cannabis. However, under the Supremacy Clause of the U.S. Constitution, federal law preempts conflicting state and local laws. In most cases, the absence of a state law does not present a preemption conflict with a federal law.

The federal government criminalized marijuana under the Interstate Commerce Clause, and the application of these laws to intrastate commerce were addressed squarely by the U.S. Supreme Court in Gonzales v. Raich, 352 F. 3d 1222 in 2005.

In January 2009, President Barack Obama's transition team organized a poll to clarify some of the top issues the American public wants to have his administration look into, and two of the top ten ideas were to legalize the use of cannabis. In July 2009, Gil Kerlikowske, Director of the Office of National Drug Control Policy, clarified the federal government's position when he stated that "marijuana is dangerous and has no medicinal benefit" and that "legalization is not in the president's vocabulary, and it's not in mine." However, a January 2010 settlement between the U.S. Drug Enforcement Administration and the Wo/Men's Alliance for Medical Marijuana (WAMM) provided an example confirming the administration policy as communicated by Attorney General Eric Holder, as WAMM reached an agreement that allowed them to re-open after being shut down by the federal government in 2002.

Following the 2012 presidential election, the Office of National Drug Control Policy under the Obama administration stated that it "steadfastly opposes legalization of marijuana and other drugs because legalization would increase the availability and use of illicit drugs, and pose significant health and safety risks". In February 2014, the administration issued guidelines to banks for conducting transactions with legal marijuana sellers so these new businesses can stash away savings, make payroll, and pay taxes like any other enterprise. However, marijuana businesses still lack access to banks and credit unions due to Federal Reserve regulations.

On August 29, 2013, the Justice Department adopted a new policy (known as the Cole memo) regarding the enforcement of federal law in states that have legalized non-medical cannabis.  The policy specified that commercial distribution of cannabis would be generally tolerated, except in certain circumstances, such as if violence or firearms are involved, the proceeds go to gangs and cartels, or if the cannabis is distributed to states where it is illegal.

On December 11, 2014, the Department of Justice told U.S. attorneys to allow Native American tribes on reservations to grow and sell marijuana, even in states where it is illegal. The policy will be implemented on a case-by-case basis and tribes must still follow federal guidelines.

On May 30, 2014, the U.S. House of Representatives passed the Rohrabacher–Farr amendment, prohibiting the Justice Department from spending funds to interfere with the implementation of state medical marijuana laws. The amendment became law in December 2014, and must be renewed each year in order to remain in effect.

On March 10, 2015, U.S. Senators Rand Paul, Kirsten Gillibrand, and Cory Booker introduced the Compassionate Access, Research Expansion and Respect States Act or CARERS Act. The bipartisan bill would move cannabis from Schedule I to Schedule II of the Controlled Substances Act. This would allow states with medical cannabis laws to legally prescribe it, and allow for much easier research into its medical efficacy. The bill would also allow grow sites besides the University of Mississippi, which has long been the sole supplier of cannabis for academic research, to supply cannabis for study.

The Food and Drug Administration has approved two synthetic cannabis drugs for treating cancer and other medical issues. The federal government of the U.S. continues to argue that smoked cannabis has no recognized medical purpose (pointing to a definition of "medical purpose" published by the DEA, not the Food and Drug Administration, the National Institutes of Health, the Centers for Disease Control, or the office of the U.S. Surgeon General and the U.S. Public Health Service). Many officials point to the difficulty of regulating dosage of cannabis (a problem for treatment as well as research), despite the availability (in Canada and the United Kingdom) of dosage-controlled Sativex. The U.S. has also pressured other governments (especially Canada and Mexico, with which it shares borders) to retain restrictions on marijuana.

On January 4, 2018, the Cole memo was rescinded by Attorney General Jeff Sessions, restoring the ability of US Attorneys to enforce federal law in states that have legalized non-medical cannabis.

On December 20, 2018, President Donald Trump signed the farm bill which descheduled hemp, making cannabis under 0.3% THC legal once again. The law may have inadvertently allowed cultivation of hemp plants with high levels of delta-8-THC, which is also psychoactive and has since become more popular recreationally across the U.S.

In February 2019, three researchers used MedMen as a case study to illustrate their concerns with marijuana companies' marketing practices. The authors criticized MedMen's use of health claims without health warnings and their appeals to youth. They called for federal regulators to investigate the marketing practices of MedMen and other US-based marijuana companies.

In June 2021, Supreme Court justice Clarence Thomas stated that "A prohibition on interstate use or cultivation of marijuana may no longer be necessary or proper to support the federal government's piecemeal approach," criticizing "[t]he federal government's ... half-in, half-out regime that simultaneously tolerates and forbids local use of marijuana."

In 2022, President Joe Biden released a budget proposal that did not extend protections for states violating federal laws around marijuana. It also did not give the District of Columbia permission to legalize, which drew mild surprise among political observers given the Democratic Party's support of D.C. autonomy.

In July 2022, Cannabis Administration and Opportunity Act "CAOA" (see Text of S.4591)' was introduced by Senators Cory Booker (D-NJ), Chuck Schumer) (D-NY), and Ron Wyden (D-OR) with the aim of decriminalizing cannabis on the federal level and officially acknowledging states' own marijuana laws. Even though the bill includes both Democratic and Republican priorities, it appears unlikely to pass.

State 

In 1973 Oregon became the first state to decriminalize cannabis, and in 2012 Colorado and Washington became the first states to legalize recreational use. As of November 2022, twenty-one states (Alaska, Arizona, California, Colorado, Connecticut, Illinois, Maine, Maryland, Massachusetts, Michigan, Missouri, Montana, Nevada, New Jersey, New Mexico, New York, Oregon, Rhode Island, Vermont, Virginia, and Washington), Guam, the Northern Mariana Islands, the U.S. Virgin Islands, and the District of Columbia have legalized recreational use of cannabis, with all but D.C. having legalized its commercial sale. Another 10 states are considered to have decriminalization policies in effect.

In 1996, California became the first state to legalize the medical use of cannabis when voters approved Proposition 215.  As of February 2022, thirty-seven states, four out of five permanently inhabited U.S. territories, and the District of Columbia have legalized medical cannabis.  Eleven other states have more restrictive laws limiting THC content, for the purpose of allowing access to products that are rich in cannabidiol (CBD), a non-psychoactive component of cannabis.

State and territory laws

 Alabama
 Alaska
 Arizona
 Arkansas
 California
 Colorado
 Connecticut
 Delaware
 Florida
 Georgia
 Hawaii
 Idaho
 Illinois
 Indiana
 Iowa
 Kansas
 Kentucky
 Louisiana
 Maine
 Maryland
 Massachusetts
 Michigan
 Minnesota
 Mississippi
 Missouri
 Montana
 Nebraska
 Nevada
 New Hampshire
 New Jersey
 New Mexico
 New York
 North Carolina
 North Dakota
 Ohio
 Oklahoma
 Oregon
 Pennsylvania
 Rhode Island
 South Carolina
 South Dakota
 Tennessee
 Texas
 Utah
 Vermont
 Virginia
 Washington
 West Virginia
 Wisconsin
 Wyoming

 American Indian Nations
 American Samoa
 District of Columbia
 Guam
 Northern Mariana Islands
 Puerto Rico
 U.S. Virgin Islands

Research 
Prior to 2021, the National Center for Natural Products Research in Oxford, Mississippi was the only facility in the U.S. that was federally licensed by the Drug Enforcement Administration to cultivate cannabis for scientific research.  The facility is part of the School of Pharmacy at the University of Mississippi, and cultivates cannabis through a contract with the National Institute on Drug Abuse, to which it provides the cannabis.

Cannabis research has been hindered by the monopoly held by the National Institute on Drug Abuse that existed prior to 2021.  The cannabis supplied by NIDA has been criticized by researchers for a variety of reasons, including high amounts of stems and seeds, high mold and yeast levels, low THC content, and low diversity of strains available.  NIDA has also been criticized for the length of time in which it responds to proposals, and for favoring research on the harms caused by cannabis over research on the health benefits of cannabis.  In August 2016 the DEA announced intention to issue additional cultivation licenses, however, and in 2021 the first licenses were granted.

Research conducted on cannabis also requires licensing from the DEA (specific to Schedule I drugs), and approval from the FDA as well.  Prior to 2015, research also required approval from the U.S. Public Health Service, but this requirement was eliminated to make it less difficult for cannabis research to be approved.  Numerous medical organizations in the U.S. have called for restrictions on cannabis research to be further eased, including the American Academy of Family Physicians, American Psychological Association, American Cancer Society, American Academy of Pediatrics, and the American Nurses Association.

Crime 

The great majority of cannabis arrests are for possession. However, in 1997, the vast majority of inmates in state prisons for marijuana-related convictions were convicted of offenses other than simple possession.

According to the Federal Bureau of Investigation's annual Uniform Crime Report, there have been over twelve million cannabis arrests in the U.S. since 1996, including 749,825 persons for marijuana violations in 2012. Of those charged with marijuana violations in 2012, 658,231 (88%) were charged with possession only. The remaining 91,593 individuals were charged with "sale/manufacture", a category that does not differentiate for cultivation offenses, even those where the marijuana was being grown for personal or medical use. Marijuana arrests comprise almost one-half (48.3%) of all drug arrests reported in the U.S. According to the American Civil Liberties Union, there were 8.2 million marijuana arrests from 2001 to 2010, and 88% of those arrests were just for having marijuana with them.

Racial disparity in marijuana arrests

In a study done by the American Civil Liberties Union, from 2001 to 2010 Black and white people use marijuana at about the same rate.Nationwide, Black people are 3.6 times more likely than white people to be arrested for marijuana, despite similar usage rates. Racial disparities vary in severity among states. For example, Colorado has the lowest disparity with Black people being 1.5 more likely than whites to be arrested for marijuana. On the other hand, in Montana, Kentucky, Illinois, West Virginia and Iowa, Black people are more than seven times more likely to be arrested for marijuana than white people. Nonetheless, in all states whether marijuana is legalized, decriminalized or illegal, Black people still are more likely of going to prison on marijuana charges, proving that legalizing or decriminalizing marijuana alone will not change the disparity. 

Racial profiling among law enforcement is to blame for these disparities. Law enforcement often targets people on their actual and perceived race instead of having reasonable suspicion for a crime. Minor offense like possession of marijuana are strictly enforced in racial communities, while the same offenses are often ignored in white affluent communities. This racial profiling results in the mass incarceration of Black, Hispanic and Latino individuals.

Political support 
The Libertarian Party and the Green Party are known for advocating for the legalization of marijuana. There are also active cannabis political parties in at least five states. These include the Grassroots-Legalize Cannabis Party, the Legal Marijuana Now Party, the Legalize Marijuana Party, and the U.S. Marijuana Party.

History of cannabis political parties in the U.S.
 The Youth International Party, formed in 1967 to advance the counterculture of the 1960s, often ran candidates for public office. The Yippie flag is a five-pointed star superimposed with a cannabis leaf.
 The Grassroots Party was founded in Minnesota in 1986 and ran numerous candidates for state and federal offices. The party was active in Iowa, Minnesota, and Vermont. Grassroots Party ran candidates in every presidential election from 1988 to 2000.
 The Legal Marijuana Now Party was established in Minnesota in 1998.
 In 1998, an independent candidate, Edward Forchion, ran for Congress from New Jersey as the Legalize Marijuana Party candidate. Since then, Forchion has run several times for a number of offices, under that banner.
 The Marijuana Reform Party was established in New York, in 1998, and ran gubernatorial candidates there in both 1998 and 2002.
 The U.S. Marijuana Party is an organization that promotes electoral involvement by marijuana legalization supporters. In 2012, the group endorsed Libertarian Gary Johnson for President.
 The Anti-prohibition Party ran candidates for office in New York State for one election cycle in 2010.
 In 2010 and 2012, independent candidate Cris Ericson was on the ballot for multiple offices in Vermont under the label of U.S. Marijuana.
 The Grassroots political party changed its name in 2014 to Grassroots-Legalize Cannabis Party.
 In 2016, the Legal Marijuana Now Party placed their presidential candidates onto the ballot in two states.

In July 2016, delegates at the 2016 Democratic National Convention voted to approve a party platform calling for cannabis to be removed from the list of Schedule I substances, as well as calling for a "reasoned pathway for future legalization".

Polling
Gallup began polling the public as to the issue of legalizing cannabis in 1969; in that year 12% were in favor. The 2017 Gallup poll showed a record high of 64% in favor of legalizing cannabis, including a majority of Republicans for the first time. In 2018, the same poll increased to an all-new high of 68%, showing that the great majority of Americans favored legalizing recreational marijuana.

According to a 2013 survey by Pew Research Center, a majority of Americans favored complete or partial legalization of cannabis.  The survey showed 52% of respondents support cannabis legalization and 45% do not. College graduates' support increased from 39% to 52% in just three years, the support of self-identified conservative Republicans (a group not traditionally supportive of cannabis legalization) had increased to nearly 30%, and bipartisan support had increased across the board.  The 2018 version of the poll showed public support had increased to 61%.

Attitudes regarding marijuana regulation changed as some states (Colorado, Washington, Oregon, Maine, and Alaska) passed their own laws legalizing marijuana for recreational use. According to a Gallup Poll published in December 2012, 64% of Americans believe the federal government should not intervene in these states.

A 2018 study in Social Science Research found that the main determinants of these changes in attitudes toward marijuana regulation since the 1990s were a decline in perception of the riskiness of marijuana, changes in media framing of marijuana, a decline in overall punitiveness, and a decrease in religious affiliation.

Marijuana legalization polled as very popular in 2019 according to three major national polls. In fact, research indicates that communities with legal, recreational marijuana use have seen home values rise more quickly than communities where recreational use remains illegal.

See also 

 Adult lifetime cannabis use by country
 Annual cannabis use by country
 Cannabis dispensaries in the United States
 Cannabis political parties
 Legality of cannabis by country
 Legality of cannabis by U.S. jurisdiction
 List of United States politicians who admit to cannabis use
 Minors and the legality of cannabis

Advocacy
 Americans for Safe Access
 Law Enforcement Against Prohibition
 Marijuana Policy Project
 National Organization for the Reform of Marijuana Laws
 National Cannabis Industry Association

References

Further reading 
 Mikos, Robert A. (2022). "Observations on 25 Years of Cannabis Law Reforms and Their Implications for the Psychedelic Renaissance in the United States". Annual Reviews.
 Anderson, D. Mark, and Daniel I. Rees. 2023. "The Public Health Effects of Legalizing Marijuana." Journal of Economic Literature 61(1): 86-143.
 Reefer Madness, a 2003 book by Eric Schlosser, detailing the history of marijuana laws in the United States
 The Emperor Wears No Clothes, a 1985 book by Jack Herer

External links 
 "Debate on California's Pot Shops" from the CBS news show 60 Minutes
 "President Obama's Drug Czar: Feds Won't Support Legalized Pot", Fresno Bee, July 22, 2009
 "Marijuana's New High Life" by the Los Angeles Times
  Marijuana Use, Social Discontent and Political Alienation] by James W. Clarke and E. Lester Levine